Skellefteå Kraft Arena is an indoor sporting arena located in Skellefteå, Sweden.  The capacity of the arena is 5,801 and it was built in 1966. and inaugurated on 6 January 1967. It is the home arena of the SHL's Skellefteå AIK as well as Hockeyettan's SK Lejon. The arena is named after Skellefteå Kraft, a Swedish power company.

Renovation
Skellefteå Kraft Arena turned into a construction site in late summer 2005, since the decision had been made to renovate the arena. By the start of the 2007/2008 season the renovation was almost finished, and the seating capacity had been increased from 5,200 to 6,001. The renovation cost an estimated 140 MSEK, and transformed the arena from a typical Swedish indoor ice hockey venue to a modern ice hockey and event arena.

See also
List of indoor arenas in Sweden
List of indoor arenas in Nordic countries

References

External links 

Skellefteakraftarena.se
Blueprints as of 2006
Blueprints as of 2005
Webcamera from the worksite

Indoor ice hockey venues in Sweden
Ice hockey venues in Sweden
Buildings and structures in Västerbotten County
Sport in Skellefteå
Sports venues completed in 1967
1967 establishments in Sweden